Michael Stark (born April 6, 1955, New Westminster, British Columbia) is a Canadian voice actor.

He was born Michael Williams and now works under the name of Michael Williams-Stark. He has worked as a voice talent for DIC Entertainment which included The Adventures of Super Mario Bros. 3, Super Mario World and Hammerman.

Other roles included Guildenstern and Soldier B in Onimusha: Warlords (for PlayStation 2), Rupert, Beetlejuice, Little Shop (the cartoon series based on the film and musical of the same name) and Noddy.

References

External links

1955 births
Living people
Male actors from British Columbia
Canadian male voice actors
People from New Westminster